Günter Zöller (born 21 May 1948) is a German figure skating coach and former competitor for East Germany. He is the 1970 World bronze medalist, the 1970 European bronze medalist, a five-time Blue Swords champion, and a five-time East German national champion.

Personal life 
Günter Zöller was born 21 May 1948 in Chemnitz.

Career 

Zöller began figure skating as a child. Coached by Jutta Müller, he represented the club SC Karl-Marx-Stadt and East Germany.

Zöller debuted at the European Championships in 1963 and finished 19th. In 1965, he won his first East German national title and was sent to the 1965 European Championships, where he placed 12th. He then competed at his first World Championships, placing 18th.

In 1967, after winning his second national title, Zöller advanced to seventh at Europeans and 11th at Worlds. He was sent to the 1968 Winter Olympics in Grenoble and finished 11th.

The 1969–70 season was Zöller's most successful. After winning his fifth national title, he was awarded bronze medals at the 1970 European Championships in Leningrad and the 1970 World Championships in Ljubljana. An injury kept him out of competition the following season. 

Zöller traveled with the East German team to the 1972 European Championships in Gothenburg, Sweden but did not compete, choosing to defect before the start of the event. On 10 January 1972, he obtained an alien's passport at the West German embassy in Sweden and boarded a ferry to Kiel. He coached in Ludwigshafen before relocating to Mannheim in 1974. His former students include Claudia Leistner, Rudi Cerne, Stefan Pfrengle, Manuela Ruben, Petra Ernert, and Nathalie Weinzierl.

Results

References

 ISU statistics
 various issues of Eissportmagazin
 various issues of Pirouette magazine

1948 births
Figure skaters at the 1968 Winter Olympics
German figure skating coaches
German male single skaters
Living people
Olympic figure skaters of East Germany
Sportspeople from Chemnitz
World Figure Skating Championships medalists
European Figure Skating Championships medalists
East German defectors